Barco is a surname. Notable people with the name include:

 Álvaro Barco (born 1967), Peruvian international footballer
 Carolina Barco (born 1951), Colombian-American diplomat
 Ezequiel Barco (born 1999), Argentine professional footballer
 George Barco (1907–1989), American lawyer and cable television executive
 Hernán Barcos (born 1984), Argentine professional footballer
 Mandalit del Barco, Peruvian reporter for National Public Radio
 Mario Barco (born 1992), Spanish footballer
 Martín del Barco Centenera (1535 – c. 1602), Spanish cleric, explorer and author
 Miguel del Barco (1706–1790), Jesuit missionary in Baja California, Mexico
 Silvano Barco (born 1963), Italian cross country skier
 Virgilio Barco Isakson (born 1965), Colombian economist
 Virgilio Barco Vargas (1921–1997), 27th President of Colombia
 Yolanda Barco (1926–2000), American lawyer and cable TV executive